Tinari is a surname. Notable people with the surname include:

Andrew Tinari (born 1995), American soccer player
Marcelo Tinari (born 1993), Argentine soccer player
Nancy Tinari (born 1959), Canadian long-distance runner
Philip Tinari (born 1979), American art critic and curator